Olivér Kovács (born 22 December 1990) is a Hungarian football player who plays for Dorog.

Career
On 3 July 2022, Kovács signed with Dorog.

References

External links
Player profile at HLSZ 

1990 births
People from Marcali
Sportspeople from Somogy County
Living people
Hungarian footballers
Association football midfielders
Marcali VFC footballers
Nagyatádi FC players
Kaposvári Rákóczi FC players
Szolnoki MÁV FC footballers
Kazincbarcikai SC footballers
Nagykanizsai SC footballers
Dorogi FC footballers
Nemzeti Bajnokság I players
Nemzeti Bajnokság II players